Mohamed Awal (born 1 May 1988) is a Ghanaian professional footballer who plays as a defender for I-League club Sreenidi Deccan.

Club career
Awal began his career with the Feyenoord Academy. On 10 July 2010, he joined ASEC Mimosas on loan. After his return in November 2010 to Feyenoord Academy, he was sold to Asante Kotoko. In August 2012, Awal joined South African Premier Soccer League club Maritzburg United.

On 8 August 2016, He signed a one-year contract with Arsenal Tula, with the option of a second, with Arsenal Tula. His previous club, Raja Casablanca, did not send the transfer documents in time for Awal to be registered for Arsenal Tula with the Russian Football Premier League by the 31 August deadline, and it has been reported on 7 September 2016 that Arsenal is planning on cancelling his contract.

At the end of November 2019, Awal joined Wolkite City F.C. in Ethiopia.

Gokulam Kerala
On 20 November 2020, it was announced that I-League club Gokulam Kerala have completed the signing of Awal. He was appointed captain of the team for the 2020–21 season.

On 6 December 2020, he made his debut for the club in the 2020 IFA Shield against United SC, which ended in a surprising 1–0 defeat. He made his I-League debut, on 9 January 2021 against Chennai City, which ended in a 2–1 defeat.

He was instrumental for the team throughout the season as he led Gokulam Kerala to their first-ever I-League trophy. After finishing fourth in group stage with six wins in twelve matches, they moved to the championship stage. They finished their maiden league campaign in third place with 32 points in 18 matches, and won the last match against Churchill Brothers on 14 May.

Sreenidi Deccan
On 24 September 2021, Awal moved to one of the new I-League entrants, Sreenidi Deccan.

On 15 December 2021, he made his debut for the club, against Real Kashmir in the 2021 IFA Shield final, which ended in a 2–1 defeat. He made his I-League debut for the club, on 27 December 2021 against NEROCA, in their 3–2 defeat.

Career statistics

Club

International career
On 31 December 2010, he was called for the Senior Ghana national football team for a CAF Tournament. He played in the 2014 World cup qualifiers alongside the African Cup of Nations.

International

International goals
Scores and results list Ghana's goal tally first.

Honours
Gokulam Kerala
 I-League: 2020–21
Sreenidi Deccan
 IFA Shield runner-up: 2021
Ghana
Africa Cup of Nations runner-up: 2015

References

External links

 Awal – Maritzburg (archived)

1988 births
Living people
Ghanaian footballers
Ghanaian expatriate footballers
Ghana international footballers
ASEC Mimosas players
West African Football Academy players
Maritzburg United F.C. players
Raja CA players
Al-Shabab FC (Riyadh) players
FC Arsenal Tula players
Asante Kotoko S.C. players
Al-Fahaheel FC players
Al-Ansar FC (Medina) players
Saudi Professional League players
Saudi First Division League players
2011 African Nations Championship players
2013 Africa Cup of Nations players
2015 Africa Cup of Nations players
Footballers from Accra
Association football defenders
Expatriate footballers in Ivory Coast
Ghanaian expatriate sportspeople in Ivory Coast
Expatriate footballers in Saudi Arabia
Ghanaian expatriate sportspeople in Saudi Arabia
Expatriate footballers in Russia
Ghanaian expatriate sportspeople in Russia
Expatriate footballers in Morocco
Ghanaian expatriate sportspeople in Morocco
Expatriate footballers in Kuwait
Ghanaian expatriate sportspeople in Kuwait
Expatriate soccer players in South Africa
Ghanaian expatriate sportspeople in South Africa
Expatriate footballers in Ethiopia
Ghanaian expatriate sportspeople in Ethiopia
Ghana A' international footballers
Ghanaian expatriate sportspeople in India
Expatriate footballers in India
Gokulam Kerala FC players
Sreenidi Deccan FC players